Expert Opinion on Pharmacotherapy is a peer-reviewed medical journal publishing review articles and original papers on new pharmacotherapies. It is published by Informa and the editor-in-chief is Dimitri P. Mikhailidis (Royal Free Hospital).

Abstracting and indexing 
The journal is abstracted and indexed in Chemical Abstracts, Current Contents/Clinical Medicine, EMBASE/Excerpta Medica, Index Medicus/MEDLINE, and the Science Citation Index Expanded. According to the Journal Citation Reports, the journal has a 2016 impact factor of 3.894.

References

External links 
 

Pharmacology journals
English-language journals
Expert Opinion journals
Publications established in 1999